Coniophanes quinquevittatus, the  five-striped snake, is a species of snake in the family Colubridae. The species is native to Mexico and Guatemala.

References

Coniophanes
Snakes of North America
Reptiles described in 1854
Reptiles of Guatemala
Reptiles of Mexico
Taxa named by André Marie Constant Duméril
Taxa named by Gabriel Bibron
Taxa named by Auguste Duméril